Andreanne  is a French feminine given name. It is used in France, Switzerland, Belgium, Canada and Quebec.  Alternative spellings are Andréan, Andréane, Andrée-Anne.

Notable people 
Notable people with this name include:

 Andréanne Abbondanza-Bergeron (born ?), Canadian artist
 Andréanne Lafond (born 1919), French-born Canadian journalist
 Andreanne Nouyrigat (born 1990), French actress

References

See also 

 
 
 Andrée
 André

French feminine given names
Given names
Feminine given names